Spirou & Fantasio is one of the most popular classic Franco-Belgian comics. The series, which has been running since 1938, shares many characteristics with other European humorous adventure comics like The Adventures of Tintin and Asterix. It has been written and drawn by a succession of artists.

Spirou and Fantasio are the series' main characters, two adventurous journalists who run into fantastic adventures, aided by Spirou's pet squirrel Spip and their inventor friend the Count of Champignac.

History

Origins of Spirou

The main character was originally an elevator (lift) operator for the Moustique Hotel (in reference to the publisher's chief magazine), and remained dressed in his red bellhop uniform for a long time after the occupation was dropped. Spirou (the name means 'squirrel' (lit.) and 'mischievous' (fig.) in Walloon) has a pet squirrel called Spip, the series' first supporting character, who was introduced on June 8, 1939, in the story arc titled  and liberated in the following week's issue, remaining a presence in all  stories since.

Adding to the difficulties of magazine publication that came with the outbreak of World War II, Velter joined the army effort, and his wife Blanche Dumoulin, using the pen name Davine, continued the work on the  strip, with the aid of the young Belgian artist Luc Lafnet. Spirou became the property of the publisher Dupuis (atypical in France and Belgium where most comics characters are owned by their creator(s)), who bought the character from Rob-Vel in 1943, and since then the series has belonged to no specific author. The title has therefore subsequently been passed on to several different artists and writers.

The first succession came in 1943 when Joseph Gillain, known by the pen name Jijé, was given charge of the character. In 1944 Jijé introduced a new character, Fantasio, who would become Spirou's best friend and co-adventurer. Holding many artistic commitments at  magazine, Jijé sought to delegate much of his work, and in 1946 he handed the series to his understudy, the young André Franquin, in the middle of the production of the story .

Franquin's 
Franquin developed the strip from single gags and short serials into long adventures with complex plots, and is usually considered as the definitive author of the strip. He introduced a large gallery of recurring characters, notably the Count de Champignac, elderly scientist and inventor; the buffoonish mad scientist Zorglub; Fantasio's cousin and aspiring dictator Zantafio; and the journalist Seccotine, a rare instance of a major female character in Franco-Belgian comics of this period.

One Franquin creation that went on to develop a life of its own was the Marsupilami, a fictional monkey-like creature with a tremendously long prehensile tail. The Marsupilami appears in the majority of the Franquin stories, starting in 1952 with Spirou et les héritiers. In the series, it is adopted by the duo and follows them everywhere they go. Marsupilamis in the wild take centre stage briefly in Le nid des Marsupilamis (1957) which presents Seccotine's documentary featuring a family in their natural habitat, the jungles of the fictitious South American state Palombia.

Starting with Le prisonnier du Bouddha (1959), Franquin began to work with Greg (writing) and Jidéhem (backgrounds). As in some of his later series (Bruno Brazil, Bernard Prince), Greg staged his stories in a realistic geopolitical context.  is set in mainland China, with veiled references made to the Cold War. As for QRN sur Bretzelburg, it takes place in two imaginary European countries which bring to mind pre-reunification Germany. Lastly, it is with Greg that Franquin created famed villain Zorglub in the diptych of Z comme Zorglub and L'ombre du Z.

However, as Franquin grew tired of Spirou, his other major character Gaston began to take precedence in his work, and following the controversial Panade à Champignac, the series passed on to a then unknown young cartoonist, Jean-Claude Fournier, in 1969. One side effect of this is that the Marsupilami would only appear in one last story, Le faiseur d'or. This is because Franquin decided to retain the rights to that character; all the other characters remained the property of the publisher. Only in the 1980s did the Marsupilami reappear in its own series, and later a television cartoon and video game.

A long transition
Fournier authored nine books in the series, which saw Spirou evolve into a more modern character. Where Franquin's stories tended to be politically neutral (in his later works, notably Idées noires, he would champion pacifist and environmental views), Fournier's stint on Spirou addressed such hot topics (for the 1970s) as nuclear energy (L'Ankou), drug-funded dictatorships (Kodo le tyran) and Duvalier-style repression (Tora Torapa).

Fournier introduced some new characters such as Ororéa, a beautiful girl reporter with whom Fantasio was madly in love (in contrast with his dislike of Seccotine); Itoh Kata, a Japanese magician; and an occult SPECTRE-like criminal organisation known as The Triangle. None of these were reused by later artists until some thirty years later when Itoh Kata appeared in Morvan and Munuera's .

However, at the end of the 1970s Fournier's pace began to slow down and the publisher, Dupuis, sought new authors to replace him. For a time, three separate teams worked on concurrent stories. Nic Broca (art) and Raoul Cauvin (writing) took on Fournier's lead without adding much to the characters. Their primary addition to the Spirou universe, namely the "Black box", a device which annihilates sound, is in fact an acknowledged rehash from an early Sophie story by Jidéhem. Strangely, the authors were not allowed by the publisher to use any of the side characters and because of this, the duo's three stories read somewhat like a parenthesis in the series.

Yves Chaland's case
Yves Chaland proposed a far more radical make-over. His (very short) stint on Spirou is an ironic re-staging of the strip as it was in the 40s. This homage to Jijé and early Franquin was seen at the time as too sophisticated for the mainstream readership. It was prepublished in 1982 in  magazine, n°2297 to n°2318, printed in two-colour, but was interrupted before it was completed. This last edition includes the original strips, and a text by Yann Le Pennetier, illustrated by Chaland, that finishes the interrupted story.

Tome and Janry – the Dynamic Duo

It was the team of Tome (writing) and Janry (art) which was to find lasting success with Spirou, both in terms of sales and critical appeal. Graphically, the authors' work was seen as a modern homage to Franquin's classic work, while their plots involved such modern topics as biotech (Virus), robotics (Qui arrêtera Cyanure?) and even time travel (the diptych of L'horloger de la comète and Le réveil du Z, featuring future descendants of the Count and Zorglub). Their position as the official Spirou authors made them the flagship team to a whole new school of young, likeminded artists, such as Didier Conrad, Bernard Hislaire or Frank Le Gall, who had illustrious careers of their own. For a time, Spirou also acted as a side character in Frank Pé's short-lived absurd humor strip  (originally published in the weekly  magazine).

With La jeunesse de Spirou (1987), Tome and Janry set out to imagine Spirou's youth. This idea was later developed into a spin-off series, Le Petit Spirou ("Young Spirou"), which details the antics of the character as an elementary school boy. A lot of the gags center around the character's interest in the opposite sex. It is generally acknowledged, however, that the Petit Spirou has little in common, psychologically speaking, with the adult character.

A new villain, the unlucky Mafia boss Vito "Lucky" Cortizone, based on the character Vito Corleone from The Godfather movies, was introduced in Spirou à New-York, while Spirou à Moscou (1990) sees Spirou and Fantasio pay their first visit to the USSR, just as it was about to collapse (the country was dissolved in 1991).

In  (1998), Tome and Janry tried to once again renew the series with a more mature storyline (wounded hero, love relationships, etc.), coupled with a more realistic graphic style. This sudden shift into a darker tone shocked many readers, although its seeds were apparent in previous Spirou albums and in other series by the same authors (Soda). While many considered the change in tone to be courageous and laudable, there was some concern that Spirou lost much of its point when presented as a "realistic" character.

in the 21st century

Morvan and Munuera
The latter kept close to the spirit of Franquin's graphical style, while bringing its own touch of manga-inspired modernism. Morvan and Munuera's Spirou is partly remarkable in that it uses background elements and secondary characters from the whole history of the title, and not just from Franquin's period.

The duo's third album,  was released 20 September 2006. Spirou and Fantasio uncover the story of two children with telekinetic powers (similarly to the manga Akira) that are forced to construct an Edo and Meiji period theme park. Dupuis has also released as  a manga story by Hiroyuki Oshima after an idea by Morvan. This story tells Spirou's adolescence as a bellhop in a five-star Tokyo hotel.

Due to a significant decline in sales, Dupuis decided to cease Morvan and Munuera work in Spirou in January 2007. However, they were allowed to complete one last album, which was released 5 November 2008, with the help of scenarist Yann.

Yoann and Vehlmann

In January 2009, it was announced in Spirou magazine #3694 that Morvan and Munuera would be succeeded by Fabien Vehlmann and Yoann, who had together created the first volume of  Their first album in the regular series was announced for October 2009, but was later pushed back to September 3, 2010, and is named . In 2018, Yoann and Vehlmann completely rebooted the series with Spirou as a superhero –  (French for 'Superbellhop') – and have since then been focusing on this version of the character.

As of 2020, Vehlmann and Yoann have created five albums (see list below), but since  was published in 2016 no new albums have appeared in the main series.

In 2006, Dupuis launched a second series of one-off volumes by various authors, under the name  ('A Spirou and Fantasio adventure by...'). It has subsequently been renamed  ('The Spirou story by...')

The first volume,  by Fabien Vehlmann and Yoann, had a modern storyline and art, not dissimilar in spirit to Morvan and Munuera's work. The second volume, by Frank Le Gall, is drawn in a more classic style not dissimilar to The Adventures of Tintin and Théodore Poussin, Le Gall's own comic series. The third, by Yann and Fabrice Tarrin, is a slightly modernized homage to Franquin's classic period. The fourth, by Emile Bravo, is a novelistic homage to the original Rob-Vel and Jijé's universes and stories, and was released to critical acclaim, being awarded at the Angoulême festival. The fifth,  by Yann and Olivier Schwartz, is based on one of Yann's old scripts from the 1980s originally intended to have been drawn by Chaland, while the editor rejected it. Yann picked up the artist Schwartz, working in a similar style, to complete the story. The story takes place among the resistance movement in the Nazi-occupied Belgium. Unlike traditional Spirou stories, but similar to other works by Yann, the story features rather much dark humour and political satire. It was released once again to some acclaim but also attracted controversy for its cavalier approach to sensitive issues. The sixth album, authored by Lewis Trondheim and Fabrice Parme, was released on April 16, 2010.

Characters

Main and recurring Spirou et Fantasio characters:
 Spirou – the main character. An investigative reporter with a strong sense of justice.
 Fantasio – Spirou's best friend and co-adventurer, a reporter with a hot temper.
 Spip – Spirou's grouchy pet squirrel.
 The Marsupilami – a very unusual creature captured in a South American jungle by Spirou and Fantasio. Marsupilami is the name of the species, and the creature never acquired an individual name. Often referred to as "the little animal" even though it can terrorise anything and anyone.
 Count of Champignac – Spirou and Fantasio's eccentric scientist friend.
 The Mayor of Champignac – petty, pompous, ineffectual and two-faced, he is mostly memorable for his trademark speeches in which he piles up mixed metaphors sky-high.
 Seccotine – their fellow reporter, a friend and rival at the same time. Gets on Fantasio's nerves, but a priceless ally.
 Gaston Lagaffe – the main source of disaster and gags at the  magazine offices. While he is the hero of his own series, he makes a few guest appearances in  stories.
 Ororéa – another brave female reporter, of Polynesian descent.
 Itoh Kata – a Japanese scientist and magician.
 Zorglub – a mad scientist as well as a former colleague of the Count of Champignac from university. Originally a foe upon his first appearance, he boasts that he could take over the world, but really wants to be recognised as the greatest scientist of all time. He is later rehabilitated and becomes a friend of the protagonists. However, his ego is never shot down as more recent albums show.

Enemies
 Zantafio – Fantasio's evil cousin.
 John Helena  (the moray) – a brutal maritime criminal.
 Don Vito "Lucky" Cortizone – New York mafia boss, father of a dangerous woman called Luna.
 Cyanure, a gynoid.

Albums
This list includes French titles, their English translation, and the first year of publication

Jijé
 Spirou et l'aventure, 1948, featuring:
 (The Aerial Meeting), 1943
 (Around the World with the Red Pilot), 1944
 (The Voyage in Time), 1944–45
 (The Abduction of Spip), 1945
 (Fantasio's Jeep), 1945–46. Also in hors-séries H2.
 (Fantasio and the Ghost), 1946. Also in hors-séries H4

André Franquin
 Spirou et Fantasio, 1948, featuring:
 Fantasio et le tank (Fantasio and his Tank), 1946. Also in hors-séries H1.
Les Maisons préfabriquées (The Prefabricated Houses), 1946. Also in hors-séries H2.
 L'Héritage (The inheritance of Spirou), 1946. Also in hors-séries H1.
Le Savant fou (The Mad Genius), 1947–48.
1. Quatre aventures de Spirou et Fantasio (Four Adventures of Spirou and Fantasio), 1950, featuring:
Les plans du robot (Spirou and the Robot's Plans), 1948
Spirou sur le ring (Spirou in the Ring), 1948
 Spirou fait du cheval (Spirou rides a horse), 1949
 Spirou chez les Pygmées (Spirou meets the Pygmees), 1949
2. Il y a un sorcier à Champignac (There is a Sorcerer in Champignac), 1951, written by Henri Gillain. First appearance of the Mayor and the Count of Champignac.
3. Les chapeaux noirs (The Black Hats), 1952; followed by:
Comme une mouche au plafond (Like a Fly on the Ceiling) by Jijé.
Spirou et les hommes-grenouilles (Spirou and the Frogmen) by Jijé.
 Mystère à la frontière (Mystery at the Frontier)
4. Spirou et les héritiers (Spirou and the Heirs), 1952. First appearance of Zantafio and the Marsupilami.
5. Les voleurs du Marsupilami (The Marsupilami Robbers), 1952; after an idea by Jo Almo. This story begins when  ends.
6. La corne de rhinocéros (The Rhinoceros Horn), 1953. First appearance of Seccotine and Turbot-Rhino I.
7. Le dictateur et le champignon (The Dictator and the Mushroom), 1953; after an idea by Maurice Rosy.
8. La mauvaise tête (Obstinate and Difficult), 1954
9. Le repaire de la murène (The Moray's Hideout), 1955. First appearance of John Helena, alias "The Moray".
10. Les pirates du silence (Pirates of Silence), 1956; with Maurice Rosy (writing) and Will (backgrounds).
 also including , 1956
11. Le gorille a bonne mine (Gorilla's in Good Shape), 1956
 also including  (Uneventful Holidays). Second cameo of Gaston Lagaffe.
12. Le nid des Marsupilamis (The Marsupilamis' Nest), 1957
 also including  (Gangsters at the Fair)
13. Le voyageur du Mésozoïque (The Traveller from the Mesozoic, 1957) First actual cameo of Gaston Lagaffe.
 also including  (Fear at the End of the Line, 1959; with Greg (writing) and Jidéhem (backgrounds).
14. Le prisonnier du Bouddha (The prisoner of the Buddha, 1959; with Greg (writing) and Jidéhem (backgrounds).
15. Z comme Zorglub (Z is for Zorglub, 1960; with Greg (writing) and Jidéhem (backgrounds). First appearance of Zorglub. Part one of two.
16. L'ombre du Z (The Shadow of Z, 1960; with Greg (writing) and Jidéhem (backgrounds). Part two of two.
17. Spirou et les hommes-bulles (Spirou and the Bubble Men, 1959)
 also including  (The Small Formats), 1960; both with Jean Roba (art).
18. QRN sur Bretzelburg (Q.R.N. over Bretzelburg), 1963; with Greg (writing) and Jidéhem (backgrounds)). A longer version was published in 1987 in a limited printing.
19. Panade à Champignac (Babysitting in Champignac), 1968; with Peyo and Gos (writing).
 also including  (Hurray for the Brothers), 1967; with Jidéhem (backgrounds).
24. Tembo Tabou, 1968, with Roba (art); followed by short stories

Jean-Claude Fournier
20. Le faiseur d'or (The gold maker, 1970). Last appearance of the Marsupilami.
21. Du glucose pour Noémie (Glucose for Noémie, 1971)
22. L'abbaye truquée (The Disguised Abbey, 1972)
23. Tora Torapa (1973)
25. Le gri-gri du Niokolo-Koba (The gris-gris of Niokolo-Koba, 1974)
26. Du cidre pour les étoiles (Cider for the Stars, 1977)
27. L'Ankou (The Ankou, 1978)
28. Kodo le tyran (Kodo the Tyrant, 1979). Part one of two.
29. Des haricots partout (Beans Everywhere, 1980). Part two of two.

Nic & Cauvin
30. La ceinture du grand froid (The great cold ring, 1983)
31. La boîte noire (The Black Box, 1983)
32. Les faiseurs de silence (The silence makers, 1984)

Tome & Janry
33. Virus (1984)
34. Aventure en Australie (Adventure in Australia, 1985)
35. Qui arrêtera Cyanure? (Who Shall Stop Cyanide?, 1985)
36. L'horloger de la comète (The Comet's Watchmaker, 1986). Part one of two.
37. Le réveil du Z (Awakening of the Z, 1986). Part two of two.
38. La jeunesse de Spirou (Spirou's Youth, 1987)
39. Spirou à New-York (Spirou in New York, 1987). First appearance of Don Vito "Lucky" Cortizone.
40. La frousse aux trousses (Fear on the tail, 1988). Part one of two.
41. La vallée des bannis (Valley of the Banished, 1989). Part two of two.
42. Spirou à Moscou (Spirou in Moscow, 1990)
43. Vito la Déveine (Bad Luck Vito, 1991)
44. Le rayon noir (The Black Ray, 1993)
45. Luna fatale (1995)
46. Machine qui rêve (Dreaming machine, 1998)

Morvan & Munuera
47. Paris-sous-Seine (Paris-under-Seine, 2004)
48. L'homme qui ne voulait pas mourir (The Man Who Didn't Want To Die, 2005)
49. Spirou et Fantasio à Tokyo (Spirou and Fantasio in Tokyo, released on September 20, 2006)
49Z.  – short Spirou manga by Hiroyuki Oshima
50. Aux sources du Z (The Origins of the Z, released on November 5, 2008)

Yoann & Vehlmann
51. Alerte aux Zorkons (Alert of Zorkons, released on September 3, 2010)
52. La Face cachée du Z (The Dark Side of the Z, released on October 21, 2011)
53. Dans les griffes de la vipère (In the Claws of the Viper, released on January 11, 2013)
54. Le groom de Sniper Alley (The Sniper Alley Bellhop, released on November 21, 2014)
55. La Colère du Marsupilami (The Wrath of the Marsupilami, released on December 2, 2016)

Guerrive, Abitan & Schwartz
56. La Mort de Spirou (The Death of Spirou, released on August 28, 2022)

Special issues

1. L'Héritage (The inheritance). Featuring:
 (Fantasio and his tank, 1946, Franquin)
 (1946, Franquin)
2. Radar le robot (Radar the robot). Featuring:
 (The prefabricated house, 1946, Jijé & Franquin)
 (1947, Franquin)
  (The lobster, 1957, Franquin)
3. La voix sans maître et 5 autres aventures (The voice without owner and 5 other adventures). Featuring stories by:
 Rob-Vel:  (Spirou's birth, 1938);  (Spirou and the flea, 1943)
 Franquin:  (Fantasio and the siphon, 1957)
 Nic:  (The solar fantacopter, 1980)
 Tome & Janry:  (1981);  (The menace, 1982);  (The money box is there, 1984);  (A week of Spirou and Fantasio, 2001)
4. Fantasio et le fantôme et 4 autres aventures (Fantasio and the ghost and other 4 adventures). Featuring stories by:
 Jijé:  (1946)
 Franquin:  (The Zorgumovil, 1976);  (Christmas in the bush, 1949);  (Fantasio and the remote-controlled skates, 1957)
 Yves Chaland:  (Steel Hearts, 1982)
 Fournier:  (Holidays at Broceliland, 1973);  (Happy Easter, dad!, 1971)

One-shots: 
1.  (The Petrified Giants, 2006, by Fabien Vehlmann (story) and Yoann (art))
2.  (The Marshlands of Time, 2007, by Frank Le Gall)
3.  (The Tomb of the Champignacs, 2007, by Yann (story) and Fabrice Tarrin (art))
4.  (Spirou, An Ingenuous [Boy]'s Diary, 2008, by Emile Bravo)
5.  (The Verdigris Groom, 2009, by Yann (story) and Schwartz (art))
6.  (Panic in the Atlantic, 2010, by Lewis Trondheim (story) and Fabrice Parme (art))
7.  (The Leopard Woman, 2014, by Yann (story) and Schwartz (art))
8.  (The Big Head, 2015, by Makyo & Toldac (story) and Tehem (art))
9.  (Fantasio is Getting Married, 2016, by Benoît Feroumont)
10.  (The Light of Borneo, 2016, by Zidrou (story) and Frank Pé (art))
11.  (The Master of the Black Hosts, 2017, by Yann (story) and Schwartz (art))
12.  (Foundation Z, 2018, by Denis-Pierre Filippi (story) and Fabrice Lebeault (art))
13.  (Première partie) (Spirou, Hope Against All Odds (Part 1), 2018, by Emile Bravo)
14.  (Spirou, Hope Against All Odds (Part 2: A Little Further Into the Horror), 2019, by Emile Bravo)
15.  (Spirou in Berlin, 2019, by Flix)
16.  (Spirou Among the Soviets, 2020, by Fred Neidhardt (story) and Fabrice Tarrin (art))
17.  (2020, by Christian Durieux)
18.  (Spirou, Hope Against All Odds (Part 3: A Departure Towards the End), 2021, by Emile Bravo)
19. Spirou, l'espoir malgré tout (Tome 4: Une fin et un nouveau départ) (Spirou, Hope Against All Odds (Part 4: An Ending and a New Beginning), 2022, by Emile Bravo)

Translations
The strip has been translated to several languages, among them Spanish, Portuguese, English, Japanese, German, Bahasa Indonesia, Vietnamese, Turkish, Italian, Dutch, Finnish, Scandinavian languages, Serbo-Croatian, Galician, Catalan and Icelandic.

One book, number 15, was translated into English, by Fantasy Flight Publishing in 1995. This edition is out of print. Book 16 was partially translated but never published.

In 1960,  was printed in the weekly British boys' magazine Knockout, under the title Dickie and Birdbath Watch the Woggle. In that early localization, Spirou was called "Dickie," Fantasio was "Birdbath," Seccotine was "Cousin Constance," the Marsupilami was "the Woggle," and the female Marsupilami was "the Wiggle."

Egmont has printed and released English translations of Spirou in 2007 in India through its Indian subsidiary (Euro Books). So far, albums number 1–11 and 14 have been translated.

Cinebook has started publishing the series in October 2009. Books released so far:

34. Spirou & Fantasio: Adventure Down Under (Aventure en Australie), 2009, 
39. Spirou & Fantasio in New York, 2010,  
40. Spirou & Fantasio: Running Scared, 2012, 
41. Spirou & Fantasio: Valley of the Exiles, 2013, 
05. The Marsupilami Thieves, 2013, 
42. Spirou & Fantasio in Moscow, 2014, 
06. The Rhinoceros' Horn, 2014, 
43. Tough Luck Vito, 2015, 
07. The Dictator and the Mushroom, 2015, 
33. Virus, 2016, 
08. The Wrong Head, 2016, 
35. Who Will Stop Cyanide?, 2017, 
15. Z is for Zorglub, 2017, 
36. The Clockmaker and the Comet, 2018,  
16. Shadow of the Z, 2018 
37. The Z Rises Again, 2019 
12. The Marsupilamis' Nest, 2020 
51. Attack of the Zordolts, 2021 
13. The Visitor from the Mesozoic, 2022 

Concurrently, Europe Comics has published translations of the One-Shot albums, available in digital form. Books released so far:

12. His Name Was Ptirou, published April 18, 2018, 
4. Spirou: The Diary of a Naive Young Man, published November 21, 2018, 
16. Spirou in Berlin, published March 20, 2019, 
14. Spirou – Hope Against All Odds: Part 1, published March 18, 2020, 
15. Spirou – Hope Against All Odds: Part 2, published June 17, 2020,

In other media
The popularity of the series has led to an adaptation of the characters into different media. On February 25, 1961, and October 16, 1963, two radio audio play adaptations were broadcast on the RTBF radio channel. Two TV cartoon series has been produced, the first, Spirou, consisting of 52 episodes originally aired between 1993 and 1994, and the second, Les Nouvelles Aventures de Spirou et Fantasio consisting of 39 episodes originally aired between 2006 and 2009. Two video games have also been produced, the first, Spirou, was released in 1995 by Infogrames, and the second, Spirou: The Robot Invasion, was released in 2000 by Ubisoft. In Sierra's Playtoons series, Spirou and Fantasio appeared in the stories "The Case of the Counterfeit Collaborator" and "The Mandarin Prince". A live-action movie adaptation directed by Alexandre Coffre was released in 2018, starring Thomas Solivérès as Spirou, Alex Lutz as Fantasio, Christian Clavier as Count of Champignac, Géraldine Nakache as Seccotine and Ramzy Bédia as Zorglub.

In popular culture

Stamps
On October 3, 1988, the Belgian Post issued a stamp featuring Spirou, drawn by Tome and Janry, in the series of comic stamps for youth philately. This was the fourth Belgian stamp showing a comic hero.

On February 26, 2006, the French Post issued a set of three  stamps, featuring art by José-Luis Munuera. To commemorate the occasion, the Musée de la Poste de Paris (Paris Mail Museum) organized an exposition from February 27 to October 7, 2006, with two halls, one showing original plates and the other more recreational, with television, games, etc.

Statues

In 1991 a statue of Spirou and Spip posing for a photograph by Fantasio was erected in the Avenue du Général Michel in Charleroi. Another statue of Spirou and Spip, designed by Monique Mol in 2003, can be seen in the Prosper Pouletstraat at the Zeedijk in Middelkerke. On 1–2 September 2016 Manneken Pis was dressed in Spirou's uniform.

Murals
Spirou, Fantasio and Spip are portrayed on a mural in the Rue Notre Dame des Grâces/Onze-Lieve-Vrouw van Gratiestraat in Brussels as part of the Brussels' Comic Book Route. The mural was based on a design by Yoann and created in 2014 by graffiti artist Urbana (Nicolas Morreel). A second mural was created in the Elsenesteenweg 227A in Elsene, based on a drawing by Schwartz and Yann from the Spirou story Spirou and the leopard woman.

In September 2016 a mural was made in Middelkerke, based on a design by Hanco Kolk and created by Art Mural vzw.

Scientific instrument
SPIRou is a near-infrared spectropolarimeter and high-precision velocimeter designed and constructed by an international consortium for observing exoplanets and the forming of Sun-like stars and their planets. Silhouettes of Spirou and Spip are featured in its logo.

References

Sources

 Spirou et Fantasio publications in Le journal de Spirou BDoubliées

External links
 Spirou official site 
 English publisher of Spirou and Fantasio – Cinebook Ltd
 History of Spirou magazine on Lambiek Comiclopedia
 InediSpirou.net 
 Spirouworld.com 

Dupuis titles
Bandes dessinées

Belgian comics titles
Belgian comic strips
Belgium in fiction
Comics set in Belgium
1938 comics debuts
Belgian comics adapted into films
Comics adapted into animated series
Comics adapted into radio series
Comics adapted into television series
Comics adapted into video games
Humor comics
Adventure comics
Fantasy comics
Works set in Wallonia
Fictional characters from Wallonia
Comedy franchises